Margrave William of Hachberg-Sausenberg (11 July 1406 – 15 August 1482) was the son of Margrave Rudolf III of Hachberg-Sausenberg and Anne of Freiburg-Neuchâtel.  He ruled from 1428 to 1441, and abdicated on 21 June 1441 in favor of his infant sons, Rudolf IV and Hugo.  As they were still infants, his cousin Count John of Freiburg-Neuchâtel took over the government as regent.

Marriage and issue 
William married Elizabeth, daughter of the Count William VII of Montfort-Bregenz.  His wife's relatives intervened because of his lavish lifestyle and he had to promise not to mortgage any assets from her dowry without their consent.  Nevertheless, his lifestyle led to a divorce in 1436.  They had at least three children: two sons, Rudolf IV and Hugo, who succeeded him, and a daughter, Ursula, who became the second wife of Count James Truchseß of Waldburg.

As William was constantly in debt and the pressure of his creditors increased, he found eventually that he could only keep his ancestral lands in the family by abdicating in favour of his sons.

Construction activities 
After his father had expanded Rötteln Castle, William dedicated himself to the expansion of Sausenburg Castle.

Expansion of the country's sovereignty 
He bought in 1432 the low justice in Efringen, Kirchen, Eimeldingen, Holzen and Niedereggenen.

On 3 November 1437, Margrave William of Hachberg, in his capacity as bailiff, gave Cüne am Bühel rights to Waldshut, Guardian of the Abbess of Königsfelden Abbey, the third part of the grain tithe to Birkingen, the tithe to Eschbach and the wine tithe on Schönenbühel to Waldshut.  He had boughts these rights from Albrecht Merler, who lived at Kadelburg.  It is not known when he bought these rights.

Diplomatic services 
Via his cousin John of Freiburg-Neuchâtel, William gained access to the court of the Duke of Burgundy in Dijon.  During the Council of Basel, he was called upon as mediator between Austria and Burgundy and later as mediator between Burgundy and France.  In 1432, the Protector of the Council, Duke William III of Bavaria appointed William of Hachberg as acting head.  In 1434, Duke Philip III of Burgundy, appointed him as councillor and Chamberlain.

In 1437, the Duke of Austria appointed him governor of the Austrian possessions in the Sundgau, Alsace and Freiburg.  As governor of Further Austria, he was involved in the war between Emperor Frederick III and the Old Swiss Confederacy.  After the Swiss defeated the Austrians in the Battle of St. Jakob an der Sihl in 1443, the Emperor sent William to King Charles VII of France to plea for help.  France sent , the so-called Armagnacs.

See also 
 Margraviate of Baden
 Baden
 List of rulers of Baden

Footnotes

References 
 Fritz Schülin: Rötteln-Haagen, Beiträge zur Orts-, Landschafts- und Siedlungsgeschichte, Lörrach, 1965, p. 65
 Fritz Schülin: Binzen, Beiträge zur Orts-, Landschafts- und Siedlungsgeschichte, Schopfheim, 1967, p. 523-524 (Genealogy of the line Hachberg-Sausenberg)
 Karl Seith: Die Burg Rötteln im Wandel ihrer Herrengeschlechter, Ein Beitrag zur Geschichte und Baugeschichte der Burg, special edition published by the vom Röttelbund e.V., Haagen, date unknown, p. 13; cited by Schülin as "In: Markgräflerland, vol. 3, issue 1, 1931"
Paul-Joachim Heinig: Kaiser Friedrich III. (1440-1493). Hof, Regierung und Politik, Cologne, Weimar and Vienna, 1997, p. 324-328
 , pp. 542–556

External links 
 

Margraves of Baden
1406 births
1482 deaths
15th-century German people